Geocharax falcata is a species of crayfish in the Geocharax genus. It was first described in 1941. It is endemic to Victoria, Australia, and is listed as vunerable by the IUCN.

References 

Parastacidae
Endemic fauna of Australia